"Willkommen" is a song from the 1966 musical Cabaret. It is performed by The Emcee. The music was written by John Kander; the lyrics by Fred Ebb.

Production
John Kander explained "With Cabaret, we were trying to find the piece, to write our way into it. The first thing we wrote was 'Willkommen' and the very first thing that ever happened was that little vamp."

The finale, "Auf Wiedersehen", mixes elements of "Willkommen" and "Cabaret".

Synopsis
The song is "the Emcee’s sardonic introduction" to the Kit Kat Klub, and is set within the cabaret itself.

Analysis
Filmsite notes this "cheery greeting in German, French and English" contains "three languages to suit the club's cosmopolitan clientele [and] anticipates future hostilities between the three nationalities during wartime".

H2G2 writes The Emcee "Immediately evok[es] the decadent, cosmopolitan atmosphere of 1930s Berlin. 'In here, life is beautiful, the girls are beautiful, even the orchestra is beautiful... we have no troubles here.' These words of the Emcee will come back to haunt the characters later."

New Line Theatre wrote the following analysis on the song and its reprise:

Critical reception
USA Today described it as "deliciously bawdy". The Providence Journal described it as an "opening chorus". The Los Angeles Times said the song was "lascivious".

Cover versions

The song was performed live at both the 1998 and 2014 Tony Awards.

Lady Gaga often presents Willkommen as an interlude on her concerts.

The song was performed by Patrick Brewer (portrayed by Noah Reid) in the Season 5 finale of Schitt's Creek.

Joel Grey performed the song in his episode of The Muppet Show.

References

1966 songs
Songs from Cabaret (musical)
Songs with music by John Kander
Songs with lyrics by Fred Ebb